Pauli Toivonen (22 August 1929 in  Jyväskylä, Finland - 14 February 2005) was a Finnish rally car driver. He drove for Citroën, Lancia and Porsche and had many successes to his credit. Toivonen had two sons, Harri and Henri, both also racing drivers.

Toivonen was awarded a controversial first place on the 1966 Monte Carlo Rally - the top three placing Minis of Timo Mäkinen, Rauno Aaltonen and Paddy Hopkirk and Roger Clark's 4th place Ford Cortina were disqualified. Rally officials determined the headlamp bulbs were not homologated, following a last minute rule change. The winner therefore became Toivonen's Citroën DS.

As a result, Toivonen did not brag about his victory in the prestigious Monte Carlo rally because he felt he had not deserved the victory. However, when his son, Henri came in first at the same event twenty years later — this time in a convincing manner — Toivonen said, "Now the name of Toivonen has been cleared."
Toivonen was European Rally champion in 1968 and won four other events for Porsche in the same year.

While Toivonen was mainly known for driving rally cars, he also drove for Porsche in World Sportscar Championship races and for Renault in the 24 Hours of Le Mans.

Notable results

24 Hours of Le Mans results

References

External links 
http://www.flyingfinns.com/toiv_p.htm

1929 births
2005 deaths
Finnish rally drivers
Finnish racing drivers
European Rally Championship drivers
Sportspeople from Jyväskylä
24 Hours of Le Mans drivers
World Sportscar Championship drivers